Park Jeong Young, sometimes written as Park, Jeong Y., is a professor in the Department of Chemistry at KAIST and associate director at the Center for Nanomaterials and Chemical Reactions at the Institute for Basic Science. He is a member of the American Chemical Society and American Vacuum Society among others, an international committee member of Asian Science Camp, and has served on the editorial boards of Scientific Reports, Advanced Materials Interfaces, Journal of the Korean Physical Society, and New Physics.

Education
Park majored in physicals at Seoul National University, where he received his B.S., M.S., and Ph.D. in 1993, 1995, and 1999, respectively.

Career
Park became a postdoctoral research associate in the Department of Physics of University of Maryland, College Park. In 2002, he worked as a physicist postdoctoral fellow in the Materials Sciences Division of the Lawrence Berkeley National Laboratory and then as a staff scientist from 2006. Returning to Korea, he taught and conducted research at KAIST as an associate professor in the Graduate School of EEWS in 2009 before becoming a full professor in the Department of Chemistry in 2017. While researching at KAIST, he joined the Institute for Basic Science (IBS) Center for Nanomaterials and Chemical Reaction as a group leader in 2013 and then became associate director in 2016. A collaboration between KAIST's Department of Chemistry and IBS, Park conducts research at Surface science and Catalysis with Atomic Level Engineering Laboratory, also known as SCALE Lab.

Research
There are four primary research topics at SCALE Lab; surface chemistry, nanocatalysis, hot electron, and scanning probe microscopy.

Surface chemistry
Research goals are to discover fundamental principles behind the formation of nanostructures to allow synthesis. Materials include single crystals, oxide–metal interfaces, nanoparticles, and solid–liquid interfaces.

Nanocatalysis
As the size, shape, and composition of nanoparticles affects catalytic activity, the lab synthesizesg multi-functional nanoparticles of different sizes, including yolk–shell, core–shell, and hybrid nanocatalysts with various surface-sensitive techniques.

Hot electron
Electronic excitation created during molecular or atomic processes at the surface has been utilized to demonstrate analogous photocurrent process and potential application in solar energy conversion technologies. The lab has worked on ways to improve the conversion efficiency.

Scanning probe microscopy
Reaction intermediates and surface mobility under catalytic reaction conditions is detectable using surface science techniques. Atomic force microscopy has permitted the investigation of nanomechanical, structural properties, and charge transport.

Memberships
 2022–present: Korean Academy of Science and Technology
 2010–present: Korean Physical Society
 2011–present: Korean Vacuum Society
 2005–present: American Chemistry Society
 2001–present: Material Research Society
 1996–present: American Vacuum Society
 1995–present: American Physical Society

Awards
 2016: KAIST Top 10 Research Achievements
 2012: Top Government R&D Achievement Award, National Science & Technology Commission
 2012: Top 50 Basic Research Achievement Award, National Research Foundation of Korea
 2012: KAIST Top 10 Research Achievements
 2011: Monthly Scientist Award, Daejeon City
 2006: Best Poster Award, Fourth Annual University Symposium on Surface Science and Its Application
 1998: Samsung Humantech Thesis Award, Samsung Electronics Corporation (Gold Medal)
 1995: Young Investigator Research Fund Award, Korea Research Foundation
 1993: Fellowship of Development Fund, Seoul National University
 1991: Alumni Association Fellowship of Physics Department, Seoul National University

Selected publications

See also 
 Gábor A. Somorjai
 Kuk Young
 Ryoo Ryong

References

External links
Jeong Young Park - Google Scholar
박정영 - Naver 인물검색
Web of Science
핫전자로 '촉매전자학' 개척

Living people
South Korean scientists
Seoul National University alumni
Institute for Basic Science
Academic staff of KAIST
Year of birth missing (living people)